Michael Brewster may refer to:

 Mike Brewster (born 1989), American football player
 Michael Brewster (artist) (1946–2016), American artist